Terby is a crater on the northern edge of Hellas Planitia, Mars. It is in the Iapygia quadrangle. It is named after François J. Terby. It is the site of an ancient lakebed and has clay deposits. Using data from Mars Global Surveyor, Mars Odyssey, Mars Express, and Mars Reconnaissance Orbiter missions researchers believe Terby's layers were formed from sediments settling under water. Crater counts show this happened during the Noachian period. It used to be thought that Terby Crater contained a large delta. However, newer observations have led researchers to think of the layered sequence as part of a group of layers that may have extended all the across Hellas. There is no valley large enough at the northern rim of Terby to have carried the large amount of sediments necessary to produce the layers. Other details in the layers argue against Terby's containing a delta. Fan deposits are some of the thickest on Mars. Hydrated minerals, including iron/magnesium phyllosilicates, have been detected in several layers.

Images

See also 

 Climate of Mars
 HiRISE
 HiWish program
 Hydrothermal circulation
 Impact event
 Lakes on Mars
 List of craters on Mars
 Ore genesis
 Ore resources on Mars
 Water on Mars

References

External links

Evidence for Lacustrine Deposition at the crater Terby
HiRISE observation of the crater Terby
Mars Express views of Terby

Iapygia quadrangle
Impact craters on Mars